CityLink Blue (BL) is a bus route operated by the Maryland Transit Administration between Bayview, Baltimore City, and Westgate, Baltimore City, or Woodlawn, Baltimore County. Most westbound trips on the route depart from Johns Hopkins Bayview Medical Center, at the intersection of East Lombard Street and Bioscience Drive in East Baltimore, and terminate at the Centers for Medicare & Medicaid Services (CMS) on Security Boulevard in Woodlawn. Some trips on late nights on weekdays or throughout the day on weekends terminate instead at the North Bend Loop by the intersection of Edmondson Avenue and North Bend Road, near the western boundary of Baltimore City. Eastbound trips travel the reverse route between these terminal stops; likewise, most of these trips depart from the CMS stop, but some depart from the North Bend Loop stop.

The CityLink Blue route runs along a largely similar path to that of the planned Red Line east-west light rail line, which was cancelled by Governor Larry Hogan in June 2015.

References

Maryland Transit Administration bus routes